Grant Taylor Singer (born July 23, 1985) is an American music video and commercial director known for working with artists such as The Weeknd,  Sky Ferreira, Lorde, Sam Smith, Ariel Pink and Skrillex.

Filmography

Films

Mania (2016)

Shawn Mendes: In Wonder (2020)

Reptile (TBA)

Music videos

References

External links
 Grant Singer on Anonymous Content official website
 

1985 births
Living people
American music video directors
Artists from Los Angeles
Television commercial directors